Gerila Glacier is  long and  wide glacier on the east side of the main crest of north-central Sentinel Range in Ellsworth Mountains, Antarctica.  It is situated north of Burdenis Glacier and south of Fonfon Glacier.  The glacier drains the saddle of the twin peak of Long Gables, flows northeastwards and together with Delyo Glacier and Burdenis Glacier joins upper Ellen Glacier north of Bruguière Peak.

The glacier is named after Gerila River in Northeastern Bulgaria.

Location
US mapping in 1961 and 1988.

See also
 List of glaciers in the Antarctic
 Glaciology

Maps
 Vinson Massif.  Scale 1:250 000 topographic map.  Reston, Virginia: US Geological Survey, 1988.
 Antarctic Digital Database (ADD). Scale 1:250000 topographic map of Antarctica. Scientific Committee on Antarctic Research (SCAR). Since 1993, regularly updated.

References
 Gerila Glacier SCAR Composite Gazetteer of Antarctica
 Bulgarian Antarctic Gazetteer. Antarctic Place-names Commission. (details in Bulgarian, basic data in English)

External links
 Gerila Glacier. Copernix satellite image

Glaciers of Ellsworth Land
Bulgaria and the Antarctic